Daedalichthys is an extinct genus of prehistoric ray finned, bony fish that lived during the Early Triassic epoch.

See also

 Prehistoric fish
 List of prehistoric bony fish

References

Early Triassic fish
Redfieldiiformes